Ayn Al-Fawwar, previously known as Ayn al-Qutt, is a village in Syria in the Homs District, Homs Governorate. According to the Syria Central Bureau of Statistics, Ayn Al-Fawwar had a population of 623 in the 2004 census.

References

Populated places in Homs District
Alawite communities in Syria